Singapore competed in the 2014 Commonwealth Games in Glasgow, Scotland from 23 July to 3 August 2014.

Media coverage 
Singaporean public broadcasting conglomerate Mediacorp held the broadcast rights of the 2014 Commonwealth Games in the country.

Medallists 

|  style="text-align:left; width:78%; vertical-align:top;"|

|  style="text-align:left; width:22%; vertical-align:top;"|

Athletics

Men
Track events

Women
Track events

Key
Note–Ranks given for track events are within the athlete's heat only
Q = Qualified for the next round
q = Qualified for the next round as a fastest loser or, in field events, by position without achieving the qualifying target
NR = National record
N/A = Round not applicable for the event
Bye = Athlete not required to compete in round

Badminton

Individual

Doubles

Mixed team

Pool E

Quarterfinals

Semifinals

Bronze medal match

Gymnastics

Artistic
Men
All-around

Individual events

Women
All-around

Rhythmic
All-around

Shooting

Men
Pistol/Small bore

Women
Pistol/Small bore

Swimming

Men

Women

Table tennis

Singles

Doubles

Team

Weightlifting

Men

References

Nations at the 2014 Commonwealth Games
Singapore at the Commonwealth Games
2014 in Singaporean sport